The RS 21, first launched in 2018 by RS Sailing and is a one design keelboat. Design for between 3 and 5 people to race competitively. The class gained World Sailing class status in 2021 and held it first recognised World Championship. With the initial fleet in Europe being joined by fleets in North America  the class continues to grow. A detuned "club" version of the boat is available for sale training and fleet charter use.

World Championships

References

External links
 Main Dealer RS Sailing
 International RS 21 Classes Association
 UK RS Association

Keelboats
2010s sailboat type designs
Classes of World Sailing
World championships in sailing
Sailboat type designs by Paul Handley
Sailboat types built by RS Sailing